Draylen Ross (born March 21, 1988) is a former American football tight end. He played college football for North Texas, where he had one reception for 8 yards in his debut game. In 2008 and 2009, Ross played defensive lineman, where he recorded a total of 40 tackles. He was signed by the Chicago Bears as an undrafted free agent in 2011. However, on August 3, 2011, Ross was waived by the Bears. In November 2011, Ross was signed by the Arizona Rattlers of the Arena Football League as a fullback. On January 6, 2012, Ross was re-signed by the Bears and spent the final nine weeks of the season on the practice squad.  On August 8, 2012, the Bears released Ross.

References

External links
 North Texas Mean Green bio
 SB Nation bio
 NFL Draft bio on CBS Sports

1988 births
Living people
People from Fort Worth, Texas
Players of American football from Texas
American football tight ends
North Texas Mean Green football players
Chicago Bears players
Arizona Rattlers players